Ora is a ghost town in Angelina County, in the U.S. state of Texas. It is located within the Lufkin, Texas micropolitan area.

History
A post office was established at Ora in 1884 and remained in operation until 1911. It operated under the name Breaker in 1884 and was changed to Ora ten years later. Ora had a general store, a corn mill, Christian and Methodist churches, a blacksmith and a physician in 1896. There were also several sawmills in operation. There were two churches in the community by as late as the 1930s. When Sam Rayburn Reservoir was completed in 1960, much of the community was overwhelmed by it. Today the same two churches , as well as the old houses , remain along with a gas station , a storage unit , and a now defunct fire department .

Geography

Education
Ora had a school that was built with wood sidings and was known as Plank School. It continued to operate in the 1930s. Today, the ghost town is located within the Huntington Independent School District.

See also
List of ghost towns in Texas

References

Geography of Angelina County, Texas
Ghost towns in East Texas